The World Wide Technology Championship at Mayakoba is a professional golf tournament on the PGA Tour in Mexico, held at Playa del Carmen, south of Cancún. It debuted in February 2007 and was the first PGA Tour event in Mexico this century.

History
Originally an alternate event in late winter, the tournament was played the same week as the WGC Match Play event in Arizona. Mayakoba was part of the FedEx Cup, but only earned half the points of a regular event. The prize fund in 2007 was US$3.5 million (with a winner's share of $630,000), making it the richest golf tournament in Mexico.

Fred Funk, a winner four months earlier on the Champions Tour, took the inaugural event in a playoff over José Cóceres of Argentina.

In 2013, the event was moved to mid-November to be part of the 2014 season as a primary event in the early part of the season, which began in October for the first time. The tournament now offered full FedEx Cup points, a Masters invitation, and a large purse increase (over 60%, to $6 million). With the tour's new schedule, the Mayakoba event was not part of the abbreviated 2013 season.

The Golf Classic is allocated four additional sponsor exemptions designated for players of Spanish or Mexican heritage from Latin America, South America, Spain, or Mexico.

In 2021, World Wide Technology was announced as the new title sponsor of the event, in a deal lasting until 2027.

In November 2022, it was noted that the El Camaleón Golf Course had been added to the roster for the 2023 LIV Golf League. With the PGA Tour and LIV Golf's ongoing legal battle, the tour decided to end its relationship with Mayakoba, making the 2022 edition the final one. In January 2023, PGA Tour commissioner Jay Monahan confirmed that the tour was working with World Wide Technology, but did not see them being back at Mayakoba.

Winners

Note: Green highlight indicates scoring records.

References

External links

Coverage on the PGA Tour's website
World Wide Technologies Mayakoba website

Former PGA Tour events
Golf tournaments in Mexico
Solidaridad (municipality)
Recurring sporting events established in 2007
2007 establishments in Mexico
Autumn events in Mexico